Chongwen District is a former district of Beijing, located relatively southeast to the city center (Tiananmen), and was situated between Yongdingmen and Qianmen. It bordered Dongcheng District to the north, Fengtai District to the south, Chaoyang District to the east, and Xuanwu District to the west. It merged into the Dongcheng District in July 2010.

Chongwen District was one of Beijing's more compact districts, with its geographic area being considerably less than other districts. Prior to its merger with Dongcheng District, it was the smallest of the four districts that composed the city center. The district was renowned for the Temple of Heaven and Longtan Park, as well as housing the two original (and the most authentic) Peking Duck restaurants, Quanjude and Bianyifang.

References 

Dongcheng District, Beijing